The canton of Casinca-Fumalto is an administrative division of the Haute-Corse department, southeastern France. It was created at the French canton reorganisation which came into effect in March 2015. Its seat is in Penta-di-Casinca.

It consists of the following communes:
 
Casabianca
Casalta
Castellare-di-Casinca
Croce
Ficaja
Giocatojo
Loreto-di-Casinca
Penta-di-Casinca
Pero-Casevecchie
Piano
Poggio-Marinaccio
Polveroso
Porri
La Porta
Pruno
Quercitello
San-Damiano
San-Gavino-d'Ampugnani
Scata
Silvareccio
Sorbo-Ocagnano
Taglio-Isolaccio
Talasani
Venzolasca
Vescovato

References

Cantons of Haute-Corse